Raj Parmar (born 1 November 1981) is a British-Asian Bollywood dancer, choreographer, and television and radio personality. Best known for his work with Sunrise Radio as a presenter on the Urban Masti Show, Raj began his career as a trained media professional. Raj is a professional dancer, establishing his own dance troupe and performing in melas across the UK. In 2014 he appeared in Channel 4's reality series Big Ballet.

Early life and presenting work 

Parmar grew up in Hounslow, West London before moving to Bradford at the age of 10. With connections to radio station Sunrise, Raj was offered unique exposure to the media world from an early age, training as a presenter and going on to host the Urban Masti Show. In his work as a presenter for Sunrise Radio, Raj has interviewed several luminaries from the Bollywood and Lollywood industries, including Akshay Kumar, Aishwarya Rai, Abhishek Bachchan, Vivek Oberoi, Rajeshwari Sachdev, Juhi Chawla, Kajal, Saif Ali Khan, Karisma Kapoor and Bipasha Basu. As well as celebrity interviews, Raj began managing and marketing the station, becoming one of the youngest directors in the broadcasting industry.

Alongside his presenting work with Sunrise, Raj has hosted a number of live stage events and is a mainstay at the Bradford mela.

Dance career 
Raj has been involved in several melas as a dancer. His unique choreography has resulted in choreography jobs for several British Asian music videos, as well as an MTV show.

Raj opened his own Bollywood dance academy, Spice Entertainment, in 1999. Alongside hosting training courses at the academy, he regularly conducts many dance workshops at schools, community centres and arts organisations such as Kala Sangam.

Acting work 

In 2006, Raj landed acting roles in the films Casino Royale and Mischief Night. In 2014 Raj performed a small role in the Indian drama serial Saraswatichandra.

Television appearances

Deal or No Deal 

In 2006, Raj appeared as a contestant on the television game show Deal or No Deal. Taking part in the first season, Raj responded to an advert in the paper, and was selected from thousands of applicants to become one of the twenty-two contestants.

Raj won £1 on the show after declining a final offer of £10,000 from the Banker.

Big Ballet 

In 2014, Raj displayed his dancing abilities in the British documentary Big Ballet broadcast on Channel 4. Competing against almost 500 other aspiring ballet contestants, Raj ultimately won a place in the 18-member dance troupe. Raj was the only Asian member of the troupe and one of two males.

The three-part documentary saw Raj train under dancer Wayne Sleep and eventually play the role of the villain Baron von Rothbart in the ballet Swan Lake.

The series aired in the US and in France.

External links
https://web.archive.org/web/20140329122526/http://www.sunriseradio.fm/NewsContent.aspx?cn=2482&cnt=News
http://www.imdb.com/news/ni56795212/
http://www.bbc.co.uk/programmes/p01rppk3

https://web.archive.org/web/20140414071105/http://www.sunriseradio.fm/TeamMember.aspx?profile=17

British male dancers
Living people
1981 births
British male actors of Indian descent